NRK3 (NRK Tre) is a digital TV channel aimed at youth and young adults and produced by the Norwegian Broadcasting Corporation.

History
Launched on 3 September 2007, and on air from 19:30 each evening, the channel features such British and American shows as Sugar Rush, Heroes, Third Watch, The Daily Show, True Blood, Top Gear and Primeval, as well as Norwegian and Scandinavian youth productions like Topp 20, and Det beste fra Åpen Post. In addition the channel recently started broadcasting the immensely popular Australian soap-opera Neighbours. Late at night, typically after midnight, NRK3 aired the show Svisj, an interactive programme with music videos and SMS chat. It ended in 2012

NRK3 shares its frequency with NRK Super, a children's TV channel that was launched on 1 December 2007. NRK Super broadcasts between 7am and 7pm.

Logos and identities

References

NRK
Television channels in Norway
Television channels and stations established in 2007
2007 establishments in Norway